Acalolepta semisericea is a species of beetle in the family Cerambycidae. It was described by Maurice Pic in 1935. It is known from China.

References

Acalolepta
Beetles described in 1935